"The Tyger" is a poem by the English poet William Blake, published in 1794 as part of his Songs of Experience collection and rising to prominence in the romantic period. The poem is one of the most anthologised in the English literary canon, and has been the subject of both literary criticism and many adaptations, including various musical versions. The poem explores and questions Christian religious paradigms prevalent in late 18th century and early 19th century England, discussing God's intention and motivation for creating both the tiger and The Lamb.

The Songs of Experience
The Songs of Experience was published in 1794 as a follow up to Blake's 1789 Songs of Innocence. The two books were published together under the merged title Songs of Innocence and of Experience, showing the Two Contrary States of the Human Soul: the author and printer, W. Blake featuring 54 plates. The illustrations are arranged differently in some copies, while a number of poems were moved from Songs of Innocence to Songs of Experience. Blake continued to print the work throughout his life. Of the copies of the original collection, only 28 published during his life are known to exist, with an additional 16 published posthumously. Only five of the poems from Songs of Experience appeared individually before 1839.

Poem

Structure
"The Tyger" is six stanzas in length, each stanza being four lines long.  Most of the poem follows the metrical pattern of its first line and can be read as trochaic tetrameter catalectic.  A number of lines, such as line four in the first stanza, fall into iambic tetrameter.

The poem is structured around core 'religious' and Christian-centric questions by the persona concerning 'the creature' including the phrase "Who made thee?". These questions use the repetition of alliteration ("frame" and "fearful") combined with imagery (burning, fire, eyes) to frame the arc of the poem.

The first stanza opens the poem with a central line of questioning stating "What immortal hand or eye, / Could frame thy fearful symmetry?". This direct address to the creature serves as a foundation for the poem's contemplative style as "the Tyger" cannot provide the persona with a satisfactory answer. The second stanza questions "the Tyger" about where he was created, while the third stanza sees the focus move from the tiger, the creation, to the creator. The fourth stanza questions what tools were used in the tiger's creation. In the fifth stanza, the narrator wonders how the creator reacted to "the Tyger", and questions who created the creature. Finally, the sixth stanza is identical to the poem's first stanza but rephrases the last line, altering its meaning. Rather than question who or what "could" create "the Tyger", the speaker wonders who "dares".

Themes and critical analysis
"The Tyger" is the sister poem to "The Lamb" (from "Songs of Innocence"), a reflection of similar ideas from a different perspective, with "The Lamb" bringing attention to innocence. In "The Tyger", there is a duality between beauty and ferocity, with Blake suggesting that understanding one requires an understanding of the other.

The "Songs of Experience" were written as contrary to the "Songs of Innocence" – a recurring theme in Blake's philosophy and work. Blake argues that humankind's struggles have their origin in the contrasting nature of concepts. Truth, his poetry demonstrates, lays in comprehending the contradictions between innocence and experience. To Blake, experience is not the face of evil but rather another component of existence. Rather than believing in war between good and evil or heaven and hell, Blake thought each man must first see and then resolve the contraries of existence and life. According to Kazin, in "The Tyger" he presents a poem of "triumphant human awareness" and "a hymn to pure being".

Musical versions
Blake's original tunes for his poems have been lost in time, but many artists have tried to create their own versions of the tunes. 
Rebecca Clarke – "The Tiger" (1929–33)
 Benjamin Britten, in his song cycle Songs and Proverbs of William Blake (1965)
Marianne Faithfull, in her song "Eye Communication" (1981) from the Dangerous Acquaintances album.
Howard Frazin, in his song "The Tiger" for soprano and piano (2008), later expanded into an overture for orchestra, "In the Forests of the Night" (2009) commissioned by the Boston Classical Orchestra.
 Duran Duran – "Tiger Tiger" (1983)
 Greg Brown, on the album "Songs of Innocence and of Experience" (1986)
 John Tavener – "The Tyger" (1987)
 Tangerine Dream – the album Tyger (1987)
 Jah Wobble – "Tyger Tyger" (1996)
 Kenneth Fuchs – Songs of Innocence and of Experience: Four Poems by William Blake for Baritone, Flute, Oboe, Cello, and Harp (completed 2006)
 Herbst in Peking – "The Tyger and The Fly" (2014)
 Qntal – "Tyger" (2014)
 Mephisto Walz – "The Tyger"
 Järnrock - "The Tyger" (2018)

Bob Dylan also refers to Blake's poem in "Roll on John" (2012).

Five Iron Frenzy uses two lines of the poem in "Every New Day" on Our Newest Album Ever! (1997).

See also
Fearful Symmetry (disambiguation)
Quasar, Quasar, Burning Bright
Eye rhyme

References
 In Star Trek (1966)  Season1 Episode 2. (Episode title "Charlie X")   Spock is heard quoting the opening two lines of this poem when under the influence of Charlie Evans

Sources
 Bentley, G. E. (editor) William Blake: The Critical Heritage. London: Routledge, 1975.
 Bentley, G. E. Jr. The Stranger From Paradise. New Haven: Yale University Press, 2003. 
 Damon, S. Foster. A Blake Dictionary. Hanover: University Press of New England, 1988.
 Davis, Michael. William Blake: A New Kind of Man. University of California Press, 1977.
 Eaves, Morris. The Cambridge Companion to William Blake, 2003.   
 Gilchrist, Alexander. The Life of William Blake. London: John Lane Company, 1907.
 Kazin, Alfred. "Introduction". The Portable Blake. The Viking Portable Library.
 Whitson, Roger and Jason Whittaker. William Blake and Digital Humanities:Collaboration, Participation, and Social Media. New York: Routledge, 2013. .

External links 

A Comparison of Different Versions of Blake's Printing of The Tyger at the William Blake Archive
The Taoing of a Sound – Phonetic Drama in William Blake's The Tyger Detailed stylistic analysis of the poem by linguist Haj Ross

1794 poems
Tigers in literature
Songs of Innocence and of Experience